De Graaf is a Dutch occupational surname. With over 21,000 people, it was the 24th most common name in the Netherlands in 2007. In modern Dutch de graaf means the count, but in the past it also referred to the head of the municipal council called schepen. A common variant form is De Graaff, with 4632 people in 2007. In Belgium, the form De Graef is most common, with 1017 people in 2018.
People with the surname include:

 Aad de Graaf (1939–1995), Dutch track cyclist
 Aileen de Graaf (born 1990), Dutch darts player 
 Anne de Graaf (born 1959), American-born Dutch children's writer, journalist and translator
 Annelotte de Graaf (born 1988), Dutch pop singer-songwriter known as "Amber Arcades"
 Arie de Graaf (born 1947), Dutch PvdA politician
 Beatrice de Graaf (born 1975), Dutch historian and terrorism expert
Door de Graaf (1920-2011), British-Dutch resistance member and translator who worked for the Special Operations Executive, later a campaigner for mental health support in the Netherlands.
 Edwin de Graaf (born 1980), Dutch footballer
  (born 1975), Dutch trance-singer
 Esmee de Graaf (born 1997), Dutch football forward
 Fred de Graaf (born 1950), Dutch VVD politician
 H. J. de Graaf (1899–1984), Dutch historian of Java
 Hermine de Graaf (1951–2013), Dutch novelist
 Isaak de Graaf (1668–1743), Dutch map maker
 Ivar de Graaf (born 1973), Dutch drummer
  (born 1955), Dutch footballer
 Jeffrey de Graaf (born 1990), Dutch darts player
 Laurens de Graaf (c.1653–1704), Dutch pirate, mercenary, and naval officer
 Lawrence B. de Graaf (born 1932), American historian
 Louw de Graaf (1930–2020), Dutch CDA politician
 Machiel de Graaf (born 1950), Dutch politician and physical therapist
 Nan Dirk de Graaf (born 1958), Dutch sociologist
 Peter DeGraaf (born 1957), American (Kansas) politician
 Regnier de Graaf (1641–1673), Dutch physician and anatomist who discovered Graafian follicles and G-spot
 Reinier de Graaf (born 1964), Dutch architect
 Thom de Graaf (born 1957), Dutch jurist and D66 politician, Deputy Prime Minister of the Netherlands
 Willem de Graaf (born c.1951), Dutch-born New Zealand footballer
De Graaff
Bart de Graaff (1967–2002), Dutch television presenter, comedian and creator
Christian de Graaff (born 1950s), Botswana Minister of Agriculture
Dieuwke de Graaff-Nauta (1930–2008), Dutch politician
Gerrit de Graaff (1931–1996), South African zoologist after whom the De Graaff's Soft-furred Mouse is named
Jan de Graaff (1943–2014), Dutch television journalist
Johannes de Graaff (1729–1813), Dutch Governor of Sint Eustatius;  first to salute an American ship
Liesbeth Pascal-de Graaff (born 1946), Dutch rower
Marcel de Graaff (born 1962), Dutch politician
 (born 1942), Dutch jazz pianist
 (1861–1953), Dutch Minister of Colonies 1919–1925
Suzanna Catharina de Graaff (1905–1968), Dutch Romanov impostor
Willem de Graaff (1923–2004), Dutch astronomer after whom the asteroid 10964 Degraaff is named
Wim de Graaff (born 1931), Dutch speed skater

DeGraaf
David DeGraaf (born 1971), American Handball player
Ken DeGraaf, American politician from Colorado

DeGraff
Geoffrey DeGraff (born 1949), birth name of American Buddhist monk Ṭhānissaro Bhikkhu

References

See also
De Graaf (restaurant), former Dutch Michelin starred restaurant
De Graaff Brothers, Dutch horticultural family company founded in 1723
De Graeff, old Dutch patrician family
De Greef, surname of the same origin
Van de Graaf (surname) or Van de Graaff, Duch toponymic surname

Dutch-language surnames
Occupational surnames

de:De Graaf